Palmerston North (known colloquially as Palmy) is a city in the North Island of New Zealand and the seat of the Manawatū-Whanganui region. Palmerston North is the country's eighth-largest urban area, with an urban population of  The estimated population of Palmerston North city is 
 
The official limits of the city take in rural areas to the south, north-east, north-west and west of the main urban area, extending to the Tararua Ranges; including the town of Ashhurst at the mouth of the Manawatu Gorge, the villages of Bunnythorpe and Longburn in the north and west respectively.

The city's location was once little more than a clearing in a forest and occupied by small communities of Māori, who called it Papa-i-Oea, believed to mean "How beautiful it is". In the mid-19th century, it was settled by Europeans—originally by Scandinavians and, later, British settlers. On foundation, the British settlement was bestowed the name Palmerston, in honour of Viscount Palmerston, a former British Prime Minister. The suffix North was added in 1871 to distinguish the settlement from Palmerston in the South Island. Today, the name is often informally shortened to "Palmy".

Early Palmerston North relied on public works and sawmilling. The west coast railway was built in 1886, linking the town to Wellington, and Palmerston North benefited from a booming pastoral farming industry. Linton Military Camp, Palmerston North Hospital, and the establishment of Massey University (in 1927) have reduced the dependence on farming due to more skilled workers, since the early 20th century. Popular attractions include Te Manawa (a museum and art gallery that includes the New Zealand Rugby Museum), and several performing arts venues.

History

Early settlement
Ngāti Rangitāne were the local Māori iwi (tangata whenua) living in the area known as Te Ahu-ā-Tūranga, when a trader, Jack Duff, became the earliest known European to explore the area . He came on a whaling ship and explored possibly as far inland as the site of Woodville. He reported his discovery on arrival back to Porirua. Colonel Wakefield heard of the potential that the Manawatu had for development and visited in 1840. In 1846 Charles Hartley, another trader, heard from tangata whenua of a clearing in the Papaioea forest and he proceeded through the dense bush and forest and discovered it for Europeans.

In 1858, the Government began negotiations with local iwi to purchase land in Manawatu. There was a dispute at the time between rival iwi Ngāti Rangitāne and Ngāti Raukawa as to who has the right to sell. The dispute is resolved in favour of Rangitāne. On a visit in 1859, John Tiffin Stewart, an employee of the Wellington Provincial Council, was shown the Papaioea clearing by Rangitāne chief, Te Hirawanu, and noted its suitability for a "good site for a township". In 1864, Te Ahu-a-Turanga Block was sold by Rangitāne to the Government for £12,000, in an effort to open the Manawatu to settlement.

Stewart returned in 1866 on behalf of the Wellington Provincial Council (under whose jurisdiction the new purchase fell) and made the original survey and subdivision in the Papaioea forest clearing. The settlement, named Palmerston to commemorate the recently deceased Prime Minister of Great Britain, was laid out according to Stewart's plan consisting of a series of wide and straight streets in a rectangular pattern. The focal point was an open space of  subsequently known as The Square. On 3 October 1866, Palmerston was formally endorsed after Isaac Earl Featherston (Wellington Provincial Superintendent) signed a proclamation defining the boundaries of the settlement. The first sections were sold after. 

Among the first settlers included Scandinavians, who arrived in 1871. They established settlements at Awapuni and Whakarongo/Stoney Creek. 

Later the same year, the suffix North was added to distinguish the settlement of the same name in Otago. In 1872 a petition was launched to change the name of the settlement. A public meeting in 1873 ends with no clear decision on the name.

The railway line was laid through the Square in 1875. The foundation stone for the original All Saints Church was laid by Louisa Snelson on 29 September 1875. By 1875 there were newspapers, a doctor and a post office.

In 1876, Palmerston North became a Local Board District, within the Wellington Provincial Council. This existed until the abolition of the provinces later the same year. Also in the same year, the council set aside land north of the Manawatu River for the purposes of a reserve. In 1890, this land was again set aside and would become in 1897, the Victoria Esplanade.

Growing population

By 1877, when the Borough Council came into existence, Palmerston North was an isolated village in the midst of the native forest that covered inland Manawatu. By 1878, the population was 880 and sawmilling was the main industry of the district. 

The arrival of the railway in 1886 saw an increase in the speed of growth and the town was at the centre of a lucrative agricultural district.  The opening of the nearby Longburn Freezing Works provided employment, while the Borough Council instigated more infrastructural schemes such as the sewerage system. The Railway through the Manawatu Gorge to Napier was completed in 1891. 

In 1893, Rangitāne sold the Hokowhitu block, increasing the area of land available for settlement. In the same year, the Public Hospital opened in a wooden building on Terrace Street (now Ruahine Street). The hospital required significant fundraising. At the end of the decade, the Boer War broke out in South Africa and men from Palmerston North were among the volunteers.

By 1900 the population had reached 6,000. In the 1910s Palmerston North's growth was steady. The population in 1911 about 10,991 (excluding Māori). The city was affected by World War I, with Awapuni Racecourse being used as an army training camp in 1914. During the course of the war, the Borough Council renamed all German-sounding and foreign street names. When the war finished in 1918, celebrations were delayed due to the Influenza epidemic.

City status
In 1930, the population reached the 20,000 threshold and Palmerston North was officially proclaimed a city, the 7th in New Zealand.  Development was slow due to the great depression and World War II. An airport was established at Milson in 1936, which is now Palmerston North Airport. From 1938, the First Labour government (1935–1949) initiated state housing programmes in West End (Savage Crescent precinct) and Roslyn.

In 1941, the Manawatu River flooded again, having last flooded in 1902. Large parts of Hokowhitu and Awapuni were underwater, with residents evacuating to higher ground (peaked at 5.8m).

In 1940 the Māori Battalion was formed in Palmerston North and trained at the Showgrounds (now Arena Manawatu). In 1942, Linton Army Camp was established. After the war, the city's growth was rapid. In 1949, the city's boundaries had extended to include Milson and Kelvin Grove. In 1953, the boundaries would further extend to include Awapuni, which in the same year, was again flooded by the Manawatu River, along with Hokowhitu. It was the largest flood since 1902.

Although work had started in 1926, it was not until 1959 the Milson Deviation of the North Island Main Trunk was opened. This meant future trains would pass to the north of the city, instead of through the Square. Later in 1963, the railway station at Tremaine Avenue opens. The last trains passed through the Square in 1964.

In 1961, the Highbury was added to the council area. In 1963, Massey University College of Manawatu was formed by the amalgamation of the Massey Agricultural College with the Palmerston North University College. In 1964, it becomes Massey University, an autonomous tertiary learning institution with the power to grant its own degrees.

In 1967, city boundaries were again extended to include land in Aokautere, Kelvin Grove, Milson, Amberley (Westbrook) and Awapuni as part of future growth for the next 25 years.

In 1969 volunteers established the Esplanade Scenic Railway at Victoria Esplanade. The railway features a 2.2 km (1.4 mi) miniature railway track offering 20 minute rides through native bush.

In 1970, the New Zealand Rugby Museum was established and a tribute to the founding father of rugby in New Zealand, Charles Munro, was opened at Massey University.

In 1971, a competition to design a civic building for the vacant railway land at the Square, is won by Wellington architects, Maurice and John Patience. The resulting building was finished in 1979. In 1976, the Manawatu and Oroua rivers flood, 24-hour rainfall records in Feilding and Palmerston North are exceeded and some residents from both locations are evacuated.

In 1977, Palmerston North City Council celebrated its Centenary of Municipal government. The Queen and the Duke of Edinburgh are among visitors to Palmerston North.

On 1 November 1989, New Zealand local government authorities were reorganised. Palmerston North City boundaries were extended to include Ashhurst, Linton and Turitea through amalgamation of parts of the former Kairanga County, Oroua County and Ashhurst Town Council.

On 1 July 2012, Bunnythorpe, Longburn, part of the area around Kairanga and an area around Ashhurst were transferred from the Manawatū District to Palmerston North City.

Geography

Although the land Palmerston North is situated on is bounded by the lofty Ruahine and Tararua ranges in the east and south respectively, the city has a predominantly flat appearance. The occasional rise in elevation occurs further away from the river and is especially pronounced in the north and northeast, and also on the south side of the river. The typical urban area elevation ranges between 20–40 metres (65–130 ft) above sea level.

This is in the Tararua ranges, south-east of Scotts Road.

This is at the river bank near Te Puna Road. Incidentally, both these locations are in the south-west of the city, by Linton.

There are  dedicated to public reserves.

Climate
On average temperatures rise above  on 20 days of the year. There are on average 200 rain-free days each year.

In the ranges that flank the city there is often sustained wind, especially in spring. Much of this land is within the city boundaries and these ranges have the reputation of providing the most consistent wind in the country.

Close to the city is the largest electricity-generating series of wind farms in the southern hemisphere, with 286 turbines in the Tararua and Ruahine Ranges providing power for approximately 50,000 homes.

Demographics

Palmerston North territorial authority 
This comprises  people in the Palmerston North urban area,  people in the Ashhurst urban area, and  people in the surrounding settlements and rural area.

Palmerston North City had a population of 84,639 at the 2018 New Zealand census, an increase of 4,560 people (5.7%) since the 2013 census, and an increase of 6,912 people (8.9%) since the 2006 census. There were 30,531 households. There were 41,286 males and 43,353 females, giving a sex ratio of 0.95 males per female. The median age was 34.0 years (compared with 37.4 years nationally), with 16,707 people (19.7%) aged under 15 years, 21,021 (24.8%) aged 15 to 29, 34,854 (41.2%) aged 30 to 64, and 12,060 (14.2%) aged 65 or older.

Ethnicities were 75.9% European/Pākehā, 18.7% Māori, 5.3% Pacific peoples, 12.0% Asian, and 3.0% other ethnicities. People may identify with more than one ethnicity.

The percentage of people born overseas was 20.2, compared with 27.1% nationally.

Although some people objected to giving their religion, 49.6% had no religion, 35.9% were Christian, 1.8% were Hindu, 1.6% were Muslim, 1.1% were Buddhist and 3.2% had other religions.

Of those at least 15 years old, 15,432 (22.7%) people had a bachelor or higher degree, and 11,508 (16.9%) people had no formal qualifications. The median income was $30,000, compared with $31,800 nationally. 9,792 people (14.4%) earned over $70,000 compared to 17.2% nationally. The employment status of those at least 15 was that 32,877 (48.4%) people were employed full-time, 9,882 (14.5%) were part-time, and 3,204 (4.7%) were unemployed.

Palmerston North urban area 
The Palmerston North urban area had a usual resident population of 76,236 at the 2018 New Zealand census, an increase of 3,939 people (5.4%) since the 2013 census, and an increase of 5,550 people (7.9%) since the 2006 census. There were 37,080 males and 39,156 females, giving a sex ratio of 0.95 males per female. Of the total population, 14,871 people (19.5%) were aged up to 15 years, 19,545 (25.6%) were 15 to 29, 30,873 (40.5%) were 30 to 64, and 10,947 (14.4%) were 65 or older.

In terms of ethnicity, 74.4% of the population identified as European (Pākehā), 19.1% as Māori, 5.6% as Pacific peoples, 12.9% as Asian, and 3.1% as other ethnicities (totals add to more than 100% since people could identify with multiple ethnicities).

Governance

Palmerston North City Council

Palmerston North is governed by a city council consisting of the mayor and 15 councillors, elected on a citywide basis. Before the 2016 election councillors were elected representing one of five city wards, but Palmerston North's electoral wards were abolished by the Local Government Commission in 2013. The 2013 election also saw the single transferable vote (STV) system introduced, replacing first past the post (FPP).
In 2017 the Council voted to create a Māori ward, but the decision was overturned by a city-wide referendum in May 2018.

As of March 2020, there are 12 independent councillors, two affiliated with the Green Party and two with Labour. A by-election was held in February 2021, electing Orphée Mickalad to fill the vacancy left by deputy mayor Tangi Utikere resigning after being elected as an MP in the 2020 general election.

The Council's functions are broken down into six units: Strategy & Planning, Customer, Finance, Community, Infrastructure, and Marketing & Communications.

The Chief Executive is Heather Shotter, who replaces Paddy Clifford.

Horizons (Manawatū-Whanganui) Regional Council
Palmerston North is the seat of the council.

For electoral and regional representation purposes, Palmerston North City makes up the Palmerston North constituency and is represented by 4 councillors:

Palmerston North Constituency Councillors as at 2019 election:
 Wiremu Te Awe Awe
 Jono Naylor
 Fiona Gordon
 Rachel Keedwell

Central governance
Palmerston North is covered by two general electorates and one Māori electorate.

The Palmerston North electorate covers the Palmerston North urban area north of the Manawatū River. The Rangitīkei electorate covers the remainder of the territorial authority, including the Palmerston North urban area south of the Manawatū River. Since the 2020 general election, the electorates have been held by Tangi Utikere of the Labour Party and Ian McKelvie of the National Party respectively. The Te Tai Hauaūru Māori electorate, held by Adrian Rurawhe of the Labour Party, covers Palmerston North.

In addition to the electorate MPs, there is one list MP based in Palmerston North: Teanau Tuiono of the Green Party.

Justice
The Palmerston North Courthouse in Main Street (east) is a combined District and High Court and serves the city and surrounding area.

Economy
Although Palmerston North has 1.9% of the population of New Zealand, 2.5% of the nation's employees work in the city. The important sectors are tertiary education, research and central government (Defence force).

At the 2013 census, the largest employment industries for Palmerston North residents were health care and social assistance (4,686 people, 13.0%), education and training (4,473 people, 12.4%), retail trade (4,062 people, 11.2%), public administration and safety (3,636 people, 10.1%), and manufacturing (2,703 people, 7.5%).

The tertiary education sector provides NZ$500 million a year to the local economy and the education sector accounted for 11.3% of the Palmerston North workforce in February 2006.

Palmerston North has economic strengths in research, especially in the bio-industry, defence, distribution and smart business sectors. The city is home to more than 70 major educational and research institutions, including New Zealand's fastest expanding university, Massey University; the Massey University Sport and Recreation Institute at the Massey University campus, Turitea; Universal College of Learning (UCOL) and Linton Army Camp.

Business innovation
Palmerston North has a long history of innovation in the business sector. A number of firms founded in or near the city have become nationally or internationally renowned. One of the largest and well known of these is GSK (GlaxoSmithKline). Glaxo had its beginnings in Bunnythorpe, now a part of Palmerston North.

Companies with National Head Offices based in Palmerston North:
 Toyota New Zealand
 Higgins Group
 FMG Insurance
 New Zealand Pharmaceuticals Limited
 Plumbing World Limited
 Steelfort Engineering Limited
 Hino Distributors (NZ) Ltd
 Hunting and Fishing New Zealand
 CB Norwood Distributors Ltd
 Sime Darby Commercial (NZ) Ltd
 Motor Truck Distributors (NZ) Ltd (National distributors of Mack, Renault and Volvo Trucks & Buses)
 Truck Stops (NZ) Ltd
 OBO

Amenities and attractions

Palmerston North has a number of facilities and attractions. It is also the gateway to attractions in other parts of the region, such as Tongariro National Park, Ruahine and Tararua Ranges. When Palmerston North Airport serviced international flights, the city was also an international gateway to Hawke's Bay, Whanganui and Taranaki.

Retail
The Plaza Shopping Centre is the largest shopping mall in the Manawatū-Whanganui region and a key shopping centre in the lower North Island, boasting over 100 stores. The mall was originally developed by the Premier Drapery Company (PDC) department store and opened in 1986 as the PDC Plaza. After PDC went into receivership in 1988, the mall was sold and assumed its current name in 1990. The shopping centre underwent refurbishment and expansion between 2008 and 2010.

Downtown on Broadway combines retail and boutique shopping and Event Cinemas.

The Square

Originally part of the Papaioea clearing, The Square is a seven-hectare park of lawn, trees, lakes, fountains, and gardens in the centre of the city. It is the city's original park and also the centrepoint from whence the city's main streets are arranged.

The Square contains the city's war memorial and a memorial dedicated to Te Peeti Te Aweawe, the Rangitāne chief instrumental in the sale of Palmerston North district to the government in 1865.
Near the centre of the park is the Hopwood Clock Tower with its illuminated cross and coloured lights. Also here is the city's iSite, the Civic Building (seat of the City Council), the City Library, Square Edge and the commercial heart of Palmerston North's CBD. Retail stores (including the Plaza) and eateries line the road surrounding the park.

In around 1878, a Māori contingent, including Te Aweawe, gathered together to choose a Māori name for The Square. They chose Te Marae o Hine, meaning "The Courtyard of the Daughter of Peace". This name reflected their hope all people of all races would live together in enduring peace.

Parks and recreational facilities

Palmerston North and its surroundings feature roughly 100 parks and reserves.

Most notable is Victoria Esplanade, a  park located along the northern bank of the Manawatu River west of Fitzherbert Avenue. It was opened in 1897 to commemorate the 60th Jubilee of Queen Victoria's reign, and includes a native bush reserve along the river bank, formal botanical gardens, playgrounds and the Café Esplanade, all connected with walking and bicycle tracks. Located within the Esplanade are several attractions. The Peter Black Conservatory is a large tropical greenhouse built in 1941 and refurbished in 2014. The Wildbase Recovery visitor centre and aviary for recovering wildlife opened in 2019 and is run in partnership with Massey University's Veterinary Hospital. The volunteer-operated Esplanade Scenic Railway features a  miniature railway track offering 20 minute rides through native bush. New Zealand's largest rose garden, the  Dugald McKenzie Rose Garden, is the site of the New Zealand international rose trials and contributed to the city's one-time nickname, "Rose City". It was recognised in 2003 by the World Federation of Rose Societies as one of the finest rose gardens in the world.

Adjacent to the Esplanade are the multi-sport playing fields of Ongley and Manawaroa Parks, the twin turf hockey fields and Fitzherbert Park, the premier cricket ground.

Elsewhere in the city are parks for sports like rugby, such as Coronation Park, Bill Brown Park and Colquhoun Park (also used for softball/baseball); and football: Skoglund Park (home of the Central Football Federation) and Celaeno Park. Memorial Park has a football pitch, and also has family-friendly facilities. The Hokowhitu Lagoon is also located nearby the Esplanade and is a popular site for recreational kayaking and canoeing.

The Lido Aquatic Centre is Palmerston North's largest aquatic centre. Freyberg Community Pool is an all-year indoor swimming pool complex located next to Freyberg High School in Roslyn.

Riverbank development 

The city council since 2012 has been beautifying the banks of the Manawatu River, opening up previously neglected areas into more accessible recreational parks and reserves. Part of this development is He Ara Kotahi, a  pedestrian and cycle track that connects the city to Massey University, adjacent research institutes and Linton Military Camp, all located on the south side of the Manawatu River. The opening in 2019 included the opening of Palmerston North's second bridge, a  pedestrian bridge connecting the Holiday Park on Dittmer Drive to the track across the river. As well as a recreational asset, He Ara Kotahi was designed to be a pedestrian and cycle commuter route between the city bridge and Massey University, to improve safety and relieve vehicle traffic volumes on the Fitzherbert Bridge. The remainder of the track to Linton crosses tributary streams with boardwalks and four smaller bridges.

Libraries
Palmerston North has a main public library with five branches and one mobile library. The central Palmerston North Library is located in the Square and houses the main collections. The other four are located in Ashhurst, Awapuni, Linton, Roslyn and Te Pātikitiki (Highbury).

Youth Space
Near the Square is the Youth Space, opened in September 2011 as a dedicated place for Palmerston North's many young people to congregate in a safe environment. Youth space is free to all, and provides table-tennis, gaming consoles, musical instruments, library books, iPads, a kitchen, and other services.

Culture

Arts
Te Manawa is the cultural museum of art, science and history. Attached to Te Manawa is the New Zealand Rugby Museum. There are many small independent galleries.
Many of New Zealand's best-known artists came from or live in Palmerston North. The list includes Rita Angus, John Bevan Ford, Shane Cotton, Paul Dibble, Pat Hanly, Brent Harris, Bob Jahnke, John Panting, Carl Sydow and Tim Wilson. Palmerston North's first artist in residence was Hinerangitoariari in 1992.

Performing arts

Palmerston North houses multiple theatres which regularly host musical performances, theatrical plays and formal events. These theatres include
Regent on Broadway Theatre is a 1393-seat multipurpose performing arts facility.
Centrepoint Theatre is a prominent professional theatre and the only one outside the main centres of New Zealand.
Globe Theatre is a small community theatre of around 200 seats, opened in November 1982 as a partnership between the City Council and the Manawatu Theatre Society: both parties contributed capital funds to enable the building to be constructed. The building was designed by local architect, Brian Elliot, who returned to design the Theatre’s major redevelopments in 2014, with the addition of a second auditorium and an extension to the foyer and cafe/bar area. The redevelopment won a New Zealand Architecture Award for Elliot's work.

Top comics including John Clarke, Jon Bridges, Jeremy Corbett, Tom Scott all come from Palmerston North as do stage, television and film performers Paul Barrett, Shane Cortese, Kate Louise Elliott, Simon Ferry, Greg Johnson, Jeff Kingsford-Brown and Alison Quigan.

Music
Palmerston North has a thriving musical scene with many national and international acts touring through the town, and many local acts performing regularly.

Local groups include the Manawatu Sinfonia and Manawatu Youth Orchestra (MYO) who perform throughout the year. The Manawatu Youth Orchestra celebrated its 50th year in September 2011.

Palmerston North is also home to the Palmerston North Brass Band. Founded in 1868 by army troops stationed in the region, Palmerston North Brass Band technically pre-dates the city of Palmerston North. In 2018 the band celebrated its 150th anniversary.

Religion 

Palmerston North is a cathedral city, and the seat of the Roman Catholic Diocese of Palmerston North. The Cathedral of the Holy Spirit, Palmerston North is its cathedral.  The Diocese of Palmerston North is currently without a Bishop following the resignation of Charles Drennan.

In the Anglican Communion, Palmerston North is under the jurisdiction of the Diocese of Wellington, under Bishop Justin Duckworth. Palmerston North is also in the Anglican Hui Amorangi of Te Pīhopatanga o Te Upoko o Te Ika, under current Pīhopa Rev. Muru Walters.

There are also many other churches with denominations such as Adventist (Mosaic Community Church and Palmerston North Seventh Day Adventist Church), Apostolic, Assembly of God (AOG), Baptist, Brethren, Christian Scientist, Church of Christ, Church of Jesus Christ of Latter-day Saints, Jehovah's Witnesses, Lutheran, Methodist, Pentecostal, Presbyterian and Religious Society of Friends.

There are Sikh gurdwara near the CBD and in Awapuni.
There are Islamic centres in Milson and West End, and an Islamic prayer centre at Massey University.

Sport

Participation in sport is an important and popular pastime in Palmerston North. Representation at a national level is predominantly provincial based, meaning most sports teams representing Palmerston North also draw their players from other towns from around Manawatu.

The premier multi-sports venue in Palmerston North is Arena Manawatu, which is known as the Central Energy Trust Arena after its headline sponsors. The main stadium (Arena One) is the home of the Manawatu Turbos rugby union team and the Robertson Holden International Speedway. There are indoor venues at Arena Manawatu where netball, basketball, volleyball and Badminton are played.

Other important venues include Memorial Park, Fitzherbert Park, Celaeno Park, Manawaroa/Ongley Park, Skoglund Park, Vautier Park and Massey University sports fields.

 # : not based in Manawatu, however, home ground when playing in Manawatu.

Infrastructure and services

Health
Palmerston North Hospital is the city's main public hospital, and is the seat of the MidCentral District Health Board. The hospital is the major trauma centre for Palmerston North, Otaki, and the Manawatu, Horowhenua and Tararua districts.

There were two private hospitals, Aorangi and Southern Cross. In 2012 these two private surgical hospitals merged and are now known as Crest Hospital.

Electricity
The Palmerston North Municipal Electricity Department (MED) was formed in 1924 to supply the city with electricity. The Manawatu-Oroua Electric Power Board (EPB) supplied the surrounding rural areas. Electricity was initially generated at the Keith Street power station until the transmission lines from Mangahao Power Station to Bunnythorpe substation were completed in March 1925. The Keith Street power station continued to regularly generate electricity until the Inter-Island HVDC link was commissioned in 1965, when it was relegated to standby duty before finally being decommissioned in 1992.

The Palmerston North MED and Mawawatu Oroua EPB were dissolved in the late 1990s with the government electricity sector reforms. The retail business was sold to Genesis Energy while the lines business became part of Powerco. Today, Powerco continues to operate the local distribution network, with electricity fed from two Transpower substations, at Bunnythorpe and at Linton. There is now a competitive electricity retail market, although Genesis continues to be the dominant retailer in the city.

Three wind farms are located on the Ruahine and Tararua Ranges bordering Palmerston North: Te Apiti windfarm, Tararua windfarm and Te Rere Hau Wind Farm. The three farms together have a maximum output of 300 MW.

Natural gas
Palmerston North was one of the original nine towns and cities in New Zealand to be supplied with natural gas when the Kapuni gas field entered production in 1970 and a 260 km high pressure pipeline from Kapuni south to Wellington (including a 27 km lateral pipeline from Himatangi to supply Palmerston North) was completed. The high pressure transmission pipelines supplying the city are now owned and operated by First Gas, with Powerco owning and operating the medium and low pressure distribution pipelines within the city.

At the 2013 census, 40.5% of Palmerston North homes were heated wholly or partially by natural gas, the highest in New Zealand.

Internet and telephone
Fibre to the premises is being deployed in Palmerston North as part of the Government's Ultra-Fast Broadband programme. , the fibre roll-out in the city is 94 percent complete, with a 42.2 percent uptake rate.

Water and sewage 
The majority of Palmerston North's water supply is drawn from the Turitea Stream, in the Tararua Range south of the city. The supply is supplemented by four artesian wells, at Papaioea Park, Takaro Park, Keith Street and Roberts Line. The waterworks first opened in 1889 and was extended in 1906, but the first sewers, septic tanks and filter beds not until 1907.  The first sewage works was at Maxwells Line. Sewage is now treated at the nearby Tōtara Road, before discharge to the river. An upgrade is being planned to reduce pollution.

Transport
Palmerston North is a significant road and rail junction. As such, it is an important distribution hub for the Central and lower North Island, with many freight distribution centres based here.

Road
Palmerston North's arterial roads are arranged in a grid pattern. There are four main dual-carriageway roads radiating from The Square, splitting the city into four quadrants: Rangitikei Street to the north, Fitzherbert Avenue to the south, and Main Street to the east and west.

State highways
Palmerston North is served by four state highways:

 State Highway 3 runs northwest–southeast from SH 1 at Sanson through central Palmerston North (via Rangitikei Street, Grey Street, Princess Street and Main Street East),  to SH 2 at Woodville. The section from Sanson forms the main route from the upper North Island, Taranaki and Whanganui into Palmerston North, while the section from Woodville forms the main route from the Hawke's Bay into Palmerston North.
 State Highway 57 runs southwest–northeast from SH 1 at Ohau, south of Levin, through the southern outskirts of Palmerston North to SH 3 east of Ashhurst. It forms the main route from Wellington to southern and eastern Palmerston North.
 State Highway 56 runs southwest–northeast from SH 57 at Makeura, northeast of Shannon, New Zealand, to the intersection of Pioneer Highway and Maxwells Line in the suburb of Awapuni. It forms the main route from Wellington to northern and western Palmerston North.
 State Highway 54 runs north-south from SH 1 at Vinegar Hill, north of Hunterville, through Feilding to SH 3 at Newbury, on the northern Palmerston North border. It provides an alternative route from the Upper North island into Palmerston North

Cycling
Palmerston North is perceived as being better for cycling than most New Zealand cities, with 2001 figures putting it a close second only to Blenheim in terms of bicycle modal share. However, by 2006, cycling to work had almost halved in a decade to 5.4% and the 2013 census found that, in the central city, only 6 cycled, but 690 travelled by motor vehicle.

The Manawatu River Pathway is great for family or beginners riders, as it is all flat to mildly contoured, with some limestone sections, as well as wide cement paths. The track has many access points to this trail, which runs for over 9 km between Maxwells Line in the West to Riverside Drive in the East. A new 3 km section has been added between Ashhurst and Raukawa Road, with plans to link this to the existing path over the next two years, making over 22 km of scenic tracks to explore alongside the river.

Palmerston North has a fairly comprehensive 65 km on-road bicycle lane network, particularly in high traffic areas, to make it safer for people to get around the city by bike. All local buses have racks for two cycles.

The cycle lane network has been criticised for a number of reasons. Motor traffic is often too fast, and there is no physical barrier between bicyclists and motorists. Most bicycle lanes in the city are marked out with parking spaces for motorist parking, making those lanes 'pointless' and raising the risk of motorists opening car doors into the path of passing bicyclists.

Rebecca Oaten, the so-called 'Helmet Lady' who campaigned nationwide in the late 1980s for a New Zealand bicycle helmet law, is from Palmerston North.

Bus

After much discussion about introducing a tramway system to Palmerston North including an ambitious tram subway under the central railway station a £60,000 loan was taken out in 1912 for a tramway scheme. Support, however was waivering and there were disagreements within the council over the mode of the trams, one of the proposals was from battery trams similar to the ones that ran in Gisborne. Eventually, the decision to install tramways in Palmerston North was rescinded by a referendum and in 1920 the die was cast for a motorbus system to begin in Palmerston North. The first buses arrived in Palmerston North by late 1921.

Urban services are coordinated by Horizons Regional Council, through Masterton-based bus company, Tranzit. Seven urban buses leave the terminal in Main Street East (in front of Palmerston North Courthouse) at least every half-hour. The buses are assigned to loop routes servicing different parts of the city. Go cards were replaced by Bee cards on 20 July 2020. The city's urban bus services are unique in New Zealand in that rides are offered free to tertiary students. The city's bus service primarily utilise diesel buses, with a battery-powered bus entering service in 2021.

The city has 13 inter-connected bus routes serving the city's suburbs. 12 of these form loops, so one bus serves two routes in one trip. The bus line to Summerhill is a complete loop so does not do this. All lines connect to the Main Street terminal, which is adjacent to the city's central Square. Direct services to Massey University and IPU exist for students. Tertiary students are offered free bus rides. This is funded by parking fees at the universities.

Bus services connect the city to several of the region's other towns, the Palmerston North airport, and Whanganui. These run less often than the urban services.

Daily services run to the nearby towns of Linton, Ashhurst, Feilding (via Airport), Foxton, Levin and Marton.

Inter-regional routes are operated by Intercity and Tranzit. Intercity's routes run south (to Wellington), north (towards Auckland, via Whanganui, Rotorua and Taupo, or Napier) and east (to Masterton) from the bus terminal in The Square, Palmerston North.

Horizons is currently seeking public submissions on the future of the urban bus services. Two options are proposed: one will increase frequency during the peak-hours, while the other will see more bus stops being closer to more people.

Air

It is a regional gateway to the central North Island region. The airport has regular services to domestic destinations including Auckland, Christchurch, Hamilton, Napier, Nelson and Wellington. Flights are currently served by Air New Zealand and Originair. For 12 years Freedom Air served Palmerston North from Brisbane, Sydney, Melbourne, The Gold Coast and Nadi with a Boeing 737-300 and an Airbus A320-200. But when Freedom Air closed for good in 2008, international services from Palmerston North ended for good as well.

The airport is presently the operational base of the Massey University School of Aviation.
The airport is also a freight hub for Parcelair.

Rail

Palmerston North is on the North Island Main Trunk Railway. There is only one passenger train run by KiwiRail: the weekday-only Capital Connection commuter train once a day to and from Wellington.

Palmerston North was formerly a stop for the Northern Explorer to and from Auckland and Wellington. The Northern Explorer scheduled passenger service was discontinued in December 2021.

Until 1964, the railway ran through the city centre, with Palmerston North railway station in The Square. The station was moved and the track diverted  to the north by the Milson Deviation in 1959–1963; work on the deviation had started in 1926.

Near the current railway station, the North Island Main Trunk railway is joined by the Palmerston North - Gisborne Line, which runs through the Manawatu Gorge to Woodville and Hawke's Bay. A connection to the Wairarapa Line is at Woodville.

Education
Palmerston North is considered "the student city" of New Zealand North Island. It is an important base for tertiary institutions. The home campuses of Massey University, Universal College of Learning (UCOL) and Institute of the Pacific United (IPU) are here. A large proportion of Palmerston North's population consists of students attending these institutions or the various Papaioea Campuses of Te Wananga o Aotearoa during the student year.

Tertiary Education Institutions

Primary and Secondary Schools

Palmerston North has five state secondary schools: Palmerston North Boys' High School and Queen Elizabeth College in the north, Freyberg High School in the north-east, Palmerston North Girls High School in the south, and Awatapu College in the south-west. The city also has one state-integrated Catholic secondary school, St Peter's College.

Palmerston North also has one special character secondary school: Cornerstone Christian School, Palmerston North

Media
The major daily newspaper in Palmerston North is the Manawatu Standard, while the weekly community newspaper is the Guardian.

Most radio stations are based outside the city, however some on the nationwide networks have studios in Palmerston North. Local radio stations include More FM (formerly "2XS") featuring the popular "Mike West in the Morning" breakfast show from 6am-10am. Sister station The Breeze also has a local breakfast show from 6am-10am hosted by Burnzee. Radio Control is the local alternative student radio station, featuring local personality Abi Symes on "The Continental Breakfast" from 7 am to 9 am. Access Manawatu 999AM is a local community station and Kia Ora FM is the local Iwi station.

The first transmitter at the site was commissioned in 1963 to relay Wellington's WNTV1 channel (now part of TVNZ 1). The current main transmitter was built in 1966.

Sister cities
Palmerston North has four sister cities:
  Missoula, Montana, United States
  Guiyang, People's Republic of China
  Kunshan, People's Republic of China
  Mihara, Hiroshima, Japan

Notable people

 Constance Abraham (1864–1942), community leader and sportswoman
 John Clarke (1948–2017), satirist, author and actor
 Matthew Conger (born 1978), FIFA international football referee
 Shane Cortese (born 1968), actor and singer
 Brendon Hartley (born 1989), racing driver and FIA World Endurance Championship champion
 Alan Loveday (1928–2016), violinist
 Joseph Nathan (1835–1912), founder of Glaxo (since merged to become the multinational GlaxoSmithKline)
Evelyn Rawlins (1889–1977), music teacher
 Grant Robertson (born 1971), Labour MP for Wellington Central and the 42nd Minister of Finance
 Ross Taylor (born 1984), Central Districts and New Zealand Black Caps cricket player and captain
 Spankie Jackzon (born 1984), winner of season 2 of RuPaul's Drag Race Down Under and season 2 of House of Drag
 Simon van Velthooven (born 1988), track racing cyclist and America's Cup sailor

Named after the city
 An NAC Vickers Viscount (ZK-NAI) was named "City of Palmerston North".  This aircraft was withdrawn from NAC service in 1975. 
 An Ansett New Zealand de Havilland Canada Dash 8 (ZK-NES) was also named "City of Palmerston North", staying in service until the airline's demise.

See also 

 List of Art Deco architecture

References

External links

Official websites
 Official website of Palmerston North City & Manawatu
 Palmerston North City Council
 Street Maps and Property Information

 
Main urban areas in New Zealand